Abdul Ghani Bin Abdul Rahman (born 12 December 1985) is a Malaysian footballer who plays as a defender for Marcerra Kuantan in the Malaysia Premier League.

Ghani played for PKNS, Negeri Sembilan, Selangor and MK Land and Felda United.

External links
 Profile at selangorfc.com 

Living people
1985 births
Malaysian footballers
PKNS F.C. players
Negeri Sembilan FA players
Felda United F.C. players
Selangor FA players
People from Selangor
Malaysian people of Malay descent
Association football fullbacks